Khartut (also Romanized as Khartūt) is a village in Shirin Su Rural District, Maneh District, Maneh and Samalqan County, North Khorasan Province, Iran. At the 2006 census, its population was 586, in 115 families.

References 

Populated places in Maneh and Samalqan County